Ricardo André Braga da Silva, known as Ricardo André (born 2 July 1983) is a Portuguese football player who plays for Os Sandinenses.

Club career
He made his professional debut in the Segunda Liga for Fafe on 6 August 2016 in a game against Braga B.

International
He won the 2000 UEFA European Under-16 Championship with Portugal.

References

1983 births
Sportspeople from Braga
Living people
Portuguese footballers
S.C. Braga B players
G.D. Joane players
AD Fafe players
Juventude de Pedras Salgadas players
G.D.R.C. Os Sandinenses players
Liga Portugal 2 players
Portugal youth international footballers
Association football midfielders